Inverclyde East Central is one of the seven wards used to elect members of the Inverclyde Council. It elects three Councillors.

The ward includes the majority of Port Glasgow, except the Bardrainney, Broadfield, Park Farm and Woodhall neighbourhoods in the east of the town which are part of the Inverclyde East ward. The modern residential developments at Kingston Dock / 4 Quays which straddle the border between Port Glasgow and Greenock is also within the Inverclyde East Central ward, as is the Gibshill neighbourhood which also adjoins The Port but was always considered to belong to Greenock. In 2019, the ward had a population of 9,512.

Councillors

Election Results

2022 Election
2022 Inverclyde Council election

2017 Election
2017 Inverclyde Council election

2012 Election
2012 Inverclyde Council election

2007 Election
2007 Inverclyde Council election

References

Wards of Inverclyde
Port Glasgow
Firth of Clyde